Gaz (also known as Jaz) is a city in the Central District of Shahin Shahr and Meymeh County, Isfahan Province, Iran.  At the 2006 census, its population was 20,432, in 5,704 families. The town is the birthplace of Adib Boroumand, who is the founder of a cultural center in the town.

References

Populated places in Shahin Shahr and Meymeh County

Cities in Isfahan Province